Tibor Heinrich von Omorovicza (3 November 1898 - 24 November 1953) was a sailor and ice hockey player from Hungary, who represented his country at the 1928 Summer Olympics in Amsterdam, Netherlands and the 1928 Winter Olympics in St. Moritz, Switzerland. He also competed in the O-Jolle event at the 1936 Summer Olympics.

References

External links
 

1898 births
1953 deaths
Hungarian male sailors (sport)
Ice hockey players at the 1928 Winter Olympics
Olympic ice hockey players of Hungary
Olympic sailors of Hungary
Sailors at the 1928 Summer Olympics – 6 Metre
Sailors at the 1936 Summer Olympics – O-Jolle
Sportspeople from Budapest